Duplex timorensis is a moth of the family Erebidae first described by George Hampson in 1926. It is known from Indonesia, including Java, the Kangean Islands and south-western Timor.

The wingspan is 7–8 mm. The forewing is relatively broad, with a bright, ovoid, yellow reniform stigma. The crosslines are all present and black. The antemedial line is prominent, broad, sharply angled subcostally. The postmedial line is prominent and waved. The subterminal line is prominent and slightly waved. The terminal line is marked by tight black interveinal spots. The hindwing is dark grey, without a discal spot. The underside of the forewing is grey and the underside of the hindwing is light grey, with a weakly marked discal spot.

References

Micronoctuini
Moths described in 1926